Bennur is a village in Dharwad district of Karnataka, India.

Demographics
As of the 2011 Census of India, there were 176 households in Bennur. The town had a total population of 858 people, consisting of 433 males and 425 females. There were 107 children ages 0-6.

References

Villages in Dharwad district